Yahya Sadeq Vaziri (11 October 1911 in Sanandaj – 30 January in Tehran) was an Iranian politician who served as the Minister of Justice from January 7, 1979 to January 17, 1979.

References

1911 births
2013 deaths
Ministers of Justice of Iran
20th-century Iranian politicians
People from Sanandaj
Iranian centenarians